Saint-Lieux-lès-Lavaur (literally Saint-Lieux near Lavaur; Languedocien: Sant Lionç de La Vaur) is a commune in the Tarn department in southern France.

See also
Communes of the Tarn department

References

Communes of Tarn (department)